Office Uprising is an American horror comedy directed by Lin Oeding and written by Peter Gamble Robinson and Ian Shorr that premiered on July 19, 2018, on Sony Crackle. The film stars Brenton Thwaites, Jane Levy, Alan Ritchson, Zachary Levi, Karan Soni and Ian Harding.

Plot 

Desmond is a slacker who works at a corporate office and factory for Ammotech, one of the world's leading weapons manufacturers. When an energy drink created by the military turns his fellow coworkers into violent psychopaths, Desmond, his crush Samantha and his best friend Mourad must rise to the challenge and survive an office full of homicidal coworkers armed with the latest weaponry.

Cast 
 Brenton Thwaites as Desmond Brimble
 Jane Levy as Samantha 
 Karan Soni as Mourad Haryana
 Zachary Levi as Adam Nusbaum 
 Kurt Fuller as Lentworth 
 Ian Harding as Nicholas Frohm 
 Gregg Henry as Franklin Gantt
 Alan Ritchson as Bob 
 Sam Daly as Marcus Gantt
 Ashton McClearin as Lisa
 Stephen Oyoung as Joe
 Barry Shabaka Henley as Clarence
 Roger J. Timber as Jerry Solomon
 Mickey Gooch Jr. as Ralph
 Kenneth Choi as Freddy Wong
 Tyron Woodley as Mario
 Travis Berens as Cloud

Production

Development
On October 26, 2016, it was announced that stunt performer Lin Oeding would direct a zombie film Office Uprising.

Filming
Principal photography on the film began in early-December 2016 in Alabama.

Release
The film released on Crackle on July 19, 2018.

See also 
 The Belko Experiment, a 2016 film with a similar premise
Mayhem, a 2017 film with a similar premise

References

External links

2018 films
American zombie comedy films
Films shot in Alabama
Films set in offices
2018 comedy horror films
2010s English-language films
2010s American films